Carl Heath (1869 – 1950) was a leader of the Quaker movement in Britain and a penal reformer. He was the Secretary of the National Peace Council during the First World War when he conceived the idea of Quaker embassies to establish an international Quaker organisation. He was a member of the Humanitarian League and Secretary of the Society for the Abolition of Capital Punishment.

References

Further reading 

 Tritton, Frederick J., Carl Heath: Apostle of Peace. London: Friends Home Service Committee, 1951

1869 births
1950 deaths
British anti-war activists
British Quakers
People from Epsom
Prison reformers